Frank Otto (born 10 February 1959) is a German former water polo player who competed in the 1984 Summer Olympics, in the 1988 Summer Olympics, and in the 1992 Summer Olympics.

See also
 Germany men's Olympic water polo team records and statistics
 List of Olympic medalists in water polo (men)
 List of men's Olympic water polo tournament top goalscorers
 List of World Aquatics Championships medalists in water polo

References

External links
 

1959 births
Living people
German male water polo players
Olympic water polo players of West Germany
Olympic water polo players of Germany
Water polo players at the 1984 Summer Olympics
Water polo players at the 1988 Summer Olympics
Water polo players at the 1992 Summer Olympics
Olympic bronze medalists for West Germany
Olympic medalists in water polo
Medalists at the 1984 Summer Olympics